Darhyl “DJ” Camper (born May 25, 1990), also known by his stage name Hey DJ, is an American singer-songwriter and record producer.

Career
Camper was born May 25, 1990 in Atlantic City, New Jersey. At the age of six, he began playing the piano. Raised in the Mays Landing section of Hamilton Township, Atlantic County, New Jersey, Camper graduated from Oakcrest High School in 2008.

In 2011 Camper, co-produced the Big Sean single “Marvin & Chardonnay" which reached number one on the US Billboard Hot R&B/Hip-Hop Songs. In 2012, he received a Grammy Award nomination for co-producing singer Elle Varner’s “Refill." Subsequently, Camper worked with artists such as Tamar Braxton, John Legend, Nicki Minaj, and Jay-Z. In 2017, Camper collaborated with Mary J. Blige on her single "Thick of It" which topped the US Adult R&B Songs chart. The following year, he executive produced on English singer Jessie J’s album R.O.S.E.. In 2019, Brandy consulted Camper to executive produce her album B7.

Camper has been a resident of New Brunswick, New Jersey.

Songwriting & production credits

Guest appearances

References

1990 births
Living people
African-American record producers
African-American male singer-songwriters
American music industry executives
Oakcrest High School alumni
People from Atlantic City, New Jersey
People from Hamilton Township, Atlantic County, New Jersey
Musicians from New Brunswick, New Jersey
21st-century African-American male singers
Singer-songwriters from New Jersey